

Otto Schulz (12 March 1900 – 28 March 1974) was a German admiral during World War II. He was a recipient of the Knight's Cross of the Iron Cross of Nazi Germany.

Otto Schulz received the Knight's Cross of the Iron Cross on 17 May 1944 for the evacuation of the 17th Army from the Crimean peninsula. The actions of the Kriegsmarine in the evacuation of the Crimea were thoroughly investigated after the operation, and the commanders-in-chief of the Heeresgruppen (Army Groups) and Armies gave the Kriegsmarine a negative performance evaluation. The commander-in-chief of the 17th Army, General Karl Allmendinger, described the presentation of the Knight's Cross of the Iron Cross to Schulz and to Vice-Admiral Helmuth Brinkmann as a bitter outrage to every German soldier who had fought on the Peninsula. In a letter to the Heeresgruppe Südukraine (Army Group South Ukraine), they accused the naval leadership of providing deliberate misinformation, of panicking and disorganization.

Awards

 Clasp to the Iron Cross (1939) 2nd Class (15 April 1940)
 War Merit Cross 1st Class with Swords (30 January 1942)
 Naval Artillery War Badge (1944)
 Knight's Cross of the Iron Cross on 17 May 1944 as Konteradmiral and Seekommandant Krim (sea commander Crimea)

References

Citations

Bibliography

 
 

1900 births
1974 deaths
Military personnel from Darmstadt
Kriegsmarine personnel of World War II
German prisoners of war in World War II held by the United States
Imperial German Navy personnel of World War I
Reichsmarine personnel
Counter admirals of the Kriegsmarine
Recipients of the clasp to the Iron Cross, 1st class
Recipients of the Knight's Cross of the Iron Cross
People from the Grand Duchy of Hesse